Fabián Vázquez (born 1943) is a Mexican equestrian. He was born in Zimapán, Hidalgo. He won a bronze medal in team eventing at the 1980 Summer Olympics in Moscow.

References

1943 births
Living people
Sportspeople from Hidalgo (state)
Mexican male equestrians
Olympic equestrians of Mexico
Olympic bronze medalists for Mexico
Equestrians at the 1980 Summer Olympics
Olympic medalists in equestrian
Medalists at the 1980 Summer Olympics